John Ratcliff (13 September 1954) is an English record producer and musician. He originally, discovered, supported and recorded the Norwegian synth-pop group a-Ha. Between 1983 and 1985 he rented a flat in Dartmouth Road, Sydenham for the band to live in as it was 200 yards from his recording studio called Rendezvous. Sometimes the band members would take a 75 yard shortcut across the adjacent warehouse roof to get into the studio. 

Over that two year period the band recorded nearly forty songs, many of which ended up on their next three albums. The most notable of these being a demo of Take On Me which embodied the distinctive a-ha sound that would later propel the band to worldwide success. 

Eventually he got the band to sign a management deal with his and Terry Slater's management company, giving Pål, Morten and Mags a 25% share each of the profits. This arrangement was quickly superseded when Slater signed them to a publishing deal with ATV. 

He is noted for re-producing 8 of the 10 tracks on a-Ha's debut album Hunting High And Low in 1985 at Eel Pie Studios near Richmond-upon-Thames. The most notable track being their worldwide hit "Take On Me".

Ratcliff has also worked with Dexy's Midnight Runners.

He is currently the musical director, a composer and performer with the Macedonian Arts Council.

Producer
All chart placings refer to UK Singles Chart and UK Albums Chart only unless indicated otherwise.

Singles:
 "Take On Me" by a-ha (1985, No. 2) (USA 1985, No. 1)

 "Love Is Reason" by a-ha (Norway 1985, Unplaced)

Albums:
 Hunting High and Low by a-ha (1985, No. 2)

References

External links

 
 

1954 births
Living people
English record producers